Idaea marcidaria is a moth of the family Geometridae first described by Francis Walker in 1861. It is found in Sri Lanka, Myanmar, China, Taiwan, Singapore and Borneo.

The wings are yellowish with a dark fasciae. Male has the forewing costa somewhat folded longitudinally.

References

Moths of Asia
Moths described in 1861